Cyclamen Ridge is a ridge in Alberta, Canada.

Cyclamen Ridge takes its name from the cyclamen flower.

References

Ridges of Alberta